The 2013–14 UNLV Runnin' Rebels basketball team represented the University of Nevada, Las Vegas during the 2013–14 NCAA Division I men's basketball season. The team was coached by Dave Rice, in his third year with the Runnin' Rebels. They played their home games at the Thomas & Mack Center on UNLV's main campus in Paradise, Nevada and were a member of the Mountain West Conference. They finished the season 20–13, 10–8 in Mountain West play to finish in a tie for third place. They advanced to the semifinals of the Mountain West Conference tournament to San Diego State. They did not play in a postseason tournament for the first time since 2009.

Departures

Recruiting

Roster

Schedule and results

|-
!colspan=9 style="background:#666666; color:#C10202;"| Exhibition

|-
!colspan=9 style="background:#666666; color:#C10202;"| Regular season

|-
!colspan=9 style="background:#666666; color:#C10202;"| Mountain West tournament

See also
2013–14 UNLV Lady Rebels basketball team

References 

UNLV
UNLV Runnin' Rebels basketball seasons
Run
Run